Dicarbonyl/L-xylulose reductase, also known as carbonyl reductase II, is an enzyme that in human is encoded by the DCXR gene located on chromosome 17.

Structure 

The DCXR gene encodes a membrane protein that is approximately 34 kDa in size and composed of 224 amino acids. The protein is highly expressed in the kidney and localizes to the cytoplasmic membrane.

Function 

DCSR catalyzes the reduction of several L-xylylose as well as a number of pentoses, tetroses, trioses, alpha-dicarbonyl compounds. The enzyme is involved in carbohydrate metabolism, glucose metabolism, the uronate cycle and may play a role in the water absorption and cellular osmoregulation in the proximal renal tubules by producing xylitol.

In enzymology, an L-xylulose reductase is an enzyme that catalyzes the chemical reaction

xylitol + NADP+  L-xylulose + NADPH + H+

Thus, the two substrates of this enzyme are xylitol and NADP+, whereas its 3 products are L-xylulose, NADPH, and H+.

This enzyme belongs to the superfamily of short-chain oxidoreductases, specifically those acting on the CH-OH group of donor with NAD+ or NADP+ as acceptor. The systematic name of this enzyme class is xylitol:NADP+ 2-oxidoreductase (L-xylulose-forming).

Clinical significance 

A deficiency is responsible for pentosuria. The insufficiency of L-xylulose reductase activity causes an inborn error of metabolism disease characterized by excessive urinary excretion of L-xylulose.

Over-expression and ectopic expression of the protein may be associated with prostate adenocarcinoma.

References

External links 
 

EC 1.1.1
NADPH-dependent enzymes
Enzymes of known structure